Drama is a 2008 album by Bitter:Sweet.

Critical reception
The album garnered polarized reviews from music critics, some of whom praised the album's production.

Track listing
All songs by Shana Halligan and Kiran Shahani.

"Intro Dramatico" - 0:10
"Get What I Want" - 3:25
"Come Along With Me" - 2:18
"The Bomb" - 3:02
"Drama" - 4:02
"Waking Up" - 3:33
"A Moment" - 4:18
"Sugar Mama" - 2:56
"Trouble" - 3:21
"Love Revolution" - 3:12
"Neurosis" - 3:12
"Drink You Sober" - 4:29
"Everything" - 5:29

References

2008 albums
Bitter:Sweet albums